The 1963 Italian general election was held in Italy on 28 April 1963. It was the first election with a fixed number of MPs to be elected, as decided by the second Constitutional Reform in February 1963. It was also the first election which saw the Secretary of Christian Democracy to refuse the office of Prime Minister after the vote, at least for six months, preferring to provisionally maintain his more influent post at the head of the party: this fact confirmed the transformation of Italian political system into a particracy, the secretaries of the parties having become more powerful than the Parliament and the Government.

Electoral system
The pure party-list proportional representation had traditionally become the electoral system for the Chamber of Deputies. Italian provinces were united in 32 constituencies, each electing a group of candidates. At constituency level, seats were divided between open lists using the largest remainder method with Imperiali quota. Remaining votes and seats were transferred at a national level, where they were divided using the Hare quota, and automatically distributed to best losers into the local lists.

For the Senate, 237 single-seat constituencies were established, even if the assembly had risen to 315 members. The candidates needed a landslide victory of two-thirds of votes to be elected, a goal which could be reached only by the German minorities in South Tirol. All remained votes and seats were grouped in party lists and regional constituencies, where a D'Hondt method was used: inside the lists, candidates with the best percentages were elected.

Historical background

During the First Republic, the Christian Democracy slowly but steadily lost support, as society modernised and the traditional values at its ideological core became less appealing to the population. Various options of extending the parliamentary majority were considered, mainly an opening to the left (apertura a sinistra), i.e. to the Socialist party (PSI), which after the 1956 events in Hungary had moved from a position of total subordination to the Communists, to an independent position. Proponents of such a coalition proposed a series much-needed "structural reforms" that would modernize the country and create a modern social-democracy. In 1960, an attempt by the right wing of the Christian Democrats to incorporate the neo-fascist Italian Social Movement (MSI) in the Tambroni government led to violent and bloody riots (Genoa, Reggio Emilia), and was defeated.

Up until the Nineties, two types of governmental coalitions characterised the politics of post-war Italy. The first were “centrist” coalitions led by the Christian Democracy party together with smaller parties: the Social Democratic Party, the Republican Party, and the Liberal Party. The first democratic government (1947) excluded both communists and the socialists, which brought about the political period known as “centrist government,” which ruled over Italian politics from 1948 to 1963. The centre-left coalition (DC-PRI-PSDI-PSI) was the second type of coalition that characterised Italian politics, coming about in 1963 when the PSI (formerly the opposition party) went into government with the DC. This coalition lasted in parliament first for 12 years (from 1964 to 1976) and then with a revival in the Eighties that lasted until the start of the Nineties.

The Socialist Party entered government in 1963. During the first year of the new centre-left government, a wide range of measures were carried out which went some way towards the Socialist Party's requirements for governing in coalition with the Christian Democrats. These included taxation of real estate profits and of share dividends (designed to curb speculation), increases in pensions for various categories of workers, a law on school organisation (to provide for a unified secondary school with compulsory attendance up to the age of 14), the nationalisation of the electric-power industry, and significant wage rises for workers (including those in the newly nationalised electric-power industry), which led to a rise in consumer demand. Urged on by the PSI, the government also made brave attempts to tackle issues relating to welfare services, hospitals, the agrarian structure, urban development, education, and overall planning. For instance, during the Centre-Left Government's time in office, social security was extended to previously uncovered categories of the population. In addition, entrance to university by examination was abolished in 1965. Despite these important reforms, however, the reformist drive was soon lost, and the most important problems (including the mafia, social inequalities, inefficient state/social services, North/South imbalance) remained largely untackled.

Parties and leaders

Results
The election fell after the launch of the centre-left formula by the Christian Democracy, a coalition based upon the alliance with the Socialist Party which had left its alignment with the Soviet Union. Some rightist electors abandoned the DC for the Liberal Party, which was asking for a centre-right government and received votes also from the quarrelsome monarchist area. The majority party so decided to replace incumbent Premier Amintore Fanfani with a provisional administration led by impartial Speaker of the House, Giovanni Leone; however, when the congress of the PSI in autumn authorized a full engagement of the party into the government, Leone resigned and Aldo Moro, secretary of the DC and leader of the more leftist wing of the party, became the new Prime Minister and ruled Italy for more than four years, ever passing through two resolved political crisis caused even by the detachment of the left wing of the PSI, which created the PSIUP and returned to the alliance with the Communists, and by disagreements into the governmental coalition.

Chamber of Deputies

Results by constituency

Senate of the Republic

Results by constituency

Maps

References

External links
Italian Interior Ministry, Historical Archive of Elections 

1963
General election
April 1963 events in Europe